Akil "Fresh" King, also known as "WorldwideFresh", is an American songwriter and producer from New York City. Mentored by producer Scott Storch, King is best known for co-writing "Black Parade", the majority of Brandy's B7, as well as his contributions to various Jessie Reyez, Beyoncé, and Ari Lennox projects, among others.

Songwriting and production credits
Credits are courtesy of Discogs, Tidal, Apple Music, and AllMusic.

Awards and nominations

References 

African-American songwriters
Living people
Year of birth missing (living people)